Hadena ectrapela is a species of cutworm or dart moth in the family Noctuidae first described by Smith in 1924. It is found in North America.

The MONA or Hodges number for Hadena ectrapela is 10321.

References

Further reading

 
 
 

Hadena
Articles created by Qbugbot
Moths described in 1898